Edward Ambrose Mellors (10 April 1907 – 7 June 1946) was an English international motorcycle road racer who rode in the Manx Grand Prix in 1927 and the Isle of Man TT from 1928 to 1939. He was the 350 cc European Champion in 1938, but died in 1946, overcome by exhaust fumes while working in a new home's poorly ventilated garage.

Youth
Mellors was born in Chesterfield, Derbyshire, one of five sons of a wheelwright and a clergyman's daughter. Two of his brothers drowned in a local canal as children. He wanted to be an International motorcycle racer and spent a lot of time riding in the Derbyshire hills. Mellors met his future wife when he was still 15. She was 21, so he lied about his age. After 7 months they got married. In 1936, when Mellors became a works rider for Velocette, they moved south to Shirley near Birmingham. They had two daughters Gladys and Joan.

Racing
In 1927 Mellors came 10th in the Manx Grand Prix on a P&M Panther.

In 1930 Mellors had a French Grand Prix 250 cc win.

In 1936 Mellors won the French Grand Prix 350 cc class.

In 1937 Mellors won the French Grand Prix 350 cc and 500 cc classes.

After initially riding in the TT races, Mellors started riding in Continental events, and in 1938 won the title of 350 cc European Champion and held the title throughout the second World War, until racing started again when petrol was no longer rationed.

Mellors was one of a few pre-World War II British riders who realised that they could probably make more money by racing regularly in Grand Prix motorcycle racing events on the Continent.

In 1927 Benelli produced a SOHC 175 cc model. In 1930 this became DOHC, and in 1935 the capacity was increased to 250 cc. With this machine Mellors won the Lightweight 1939 Isle of Man TT.

World War II
During World War II Mellors worked in munitions and was with the volunteer fire service. He applied, but was not accepted for the Air Force due to slightly defective eyesight, despite already having a private air pilot’s licence.

Mellors designed and patented a rotary valve system in the early 1940s, during World War II. He was issued Patent 559830, in March 1944.

Mellors also wrote magazine articles and had an unpublished fictionalised biography.

Accidental death
In 1946, two days after moving into a new home in Etwall Road, Hall Green, Birmingham, Mellors was overcome by exhaust fumes while working on a car, and it was his daughter Joan, arriving home from school, who found him. The Birmingham Coroner’s Court recorded a verdict of accidental death. He was 39 years old.

Sources

1907 births
1946 deaths
Sportspeople from Chesterfield, Derbyshire
English motorcycle racers
Isle of Man TT riders
Deaths from carbon monoxide poisoning
Accidental deaths in England